Agustín Calleri (born 14 September 1976) is a retired professional male tennis player from Argentina. His nickname is Gordo which means Fat in Spanish. He is known as a hard-hitter and he prefers playing on clay.

Calleri served as a member of the Argentine Chamber of Deputies from 2016 to 2017, as part of the United for a New Alternative alliance.

Career
Born in Río Cuarto, Córdoba, Argentina, he picked up first ATP win in 1999 over Jan Vacek at Roland Garros. Also advanced to first quarter-final at Umag. In 2000 he made the third round in Roland Garros, before losing to Andrei Medvedev. He beat Marat Safin in Kitzbühel and pushed Pete Sampras to two tie-breakers in US Open's third round. Then in 2001 he won three challenger events beating Juan Ignacio Chela and David Nalbandian.

He finished in Top 50 for his first time in 2002, and had match points to Nicolás Massú in Buenos Aires final. Later in October he beat Marat Safin and Thomas Johansson to make an impressive quarterfinal in Madrid.

In 2003 he won his first ATP title of his career in Acapulco where he defeated Gastón Gaudio, Marcelo Ríos, Felix Mantilla and then Mariano Zabaleta in the final and reached his career-high ranking of World No. 16. In Estoril he reached the final but lost to Nikolay Davydenko. In Hamburg he made his greatest result reaching the final before losing to Guillermo Coria in straight sets. He also posted a stunning win against former No. 1 Juan Carlos Ferrero in Davis Cup.

In 2004 he beat Andre Agassi in Miami before losing to Vince Spadea and reached the decisive match at Costa Do Sauipe. In 2005 he lost the final in Amersfoort to Chilean Fernando González.

Calleri won his second career title in the 2006 Generali Open at Kitzbühel which came 3 years after his first title in Acapulco for the loss of only one set along the way he defeated Nicolás Massú, Gastón Gaudio, Fernando Verdasco before defeating fellow countryman Juan Ignacio Chela 7–6 (9) 6–2 6–3. Calleri made his first final on hardcourt in New Haven losing to Russian Nikolay Davydenko 6–4 6–3 and after this result will move inside the top 30 in the ATP rankings. At the 2007 US Open, Calleri made it to the third round after defeating Lleyton Hewitt 4–6 6–4 6–4 6–2.

Calleri announced his retirement in February 2010 at the age of 33.

Career finals

ATP career finals

Singles: 8 (2 titles, 6 runner-ups)

Doubles: 4 (3 titles, 1 runner-up)

ATP Challenger and ITF Futures finals

Singles: 12 (11–1)

Doubles: 9 (6–3)

Performance timelines

Singles

Doubles

Notes

References

External links
 
 
 
 
 
 

1976 births
Living people
Argentine male tennis players
Argentine people of Italian descent
Olympic tennis players of Argentina
People from Río Cuarto, Córdoba
Tennis players at the 2004 Summer Olympics
Tennis players at the 2008 Summer Olympics
Members of the Argentine Chamber of Deputies elected in Córdoba
Sportspeople from Córdoba Province, Argentina